Orluis Alberto Aular Sanabria (born 5 November 1996) is a Venezuelan cyclist, who currently rides for UCI ProTeam .

Major results

2016
 1st Stage 1 Vuelta al Táchira
2018
 1st Stage 10 Vuelta a Venezuela
2019
 National Road Championships
1st  Time trial
2nd Road race
 1st  Overall Vuelta a Venezuela
1st  Points classification
1st  Mountains classification
1st Stages 2, 3, 4, 5 (ITT) & 6
 1st  Overall Tour de Kumano
1st  Points classification
1st Stage 1
 Vuelta al Táchira
1st  Points classification
1st Stage 3
 2nd Overall Tour de Tochigi
 6th Time trial, Pan American Games
 9th Overall Vuelta a Miranda
1st  Points classification
1st Stages 2 & 6
 10th Japan Cup
2020 
 1st  Overall Vuelta a Venezuela
 National Road Championships
3rd Road race
3rd Time trial
2022
 National Road Championships
1st  Time trial
1st  Road race
 1st  Overall Volta ao Alentejo
1st  Points classification
1st Stages 1 & 4 (ITT)
 South American Games
1st  Road race
4th Time trial
 1st Clássica da Arrábida
 1st  Points classification, Boucles de la Mayenne
 Pan American Championships
3rd  Time trial
10th Road race
 Bolivarian Games
4th Road race
4th Time trial
 6th Vuelta a Murcia
2023
 1st Clássica da Arrábida

References

External links

1996 births
Living people
Venezuelan male cyclists
People from Yaracuy
Cyclists at the 2019 Pan American Games
Pan American Games competitors for Venezuela
Olympic cyclists of Venezuela
Cyclists at the 2020 Summer Olympics
20th-century Venezuelan people
21st-century Venezuelan people